Josh Brunty is a professor of digital forensics at Marshall University in Huntington, West Virginia.
He is a member of the Digital Evidence Subcommittee of the NIST Organization of Scientific Area Committees for Forensic Science.

Career
Prior to joining Marshall University in 2012, Brunty spent several years as a Digital Forensics Examiner and Laboratory Technical Leader in various laboratories, as well as serving on several federal and state-level cyber-crime task forces and panels. 

Brunty's early research as a graduate student involved the automatic verification and validation of tools. These validation practices are commonplace in many modern digital forensic tools and lab practices.

Brunty is the author of books, book chapters, and journal publications in the field of digital forensics, mobile device forensics, and social media investigation. His research interests include: social media forensics, mobile device exploitation and forensics, and image and video forensics. He is a frequent speaker at international and national digital forensic and security conferences, and guest lectures at various universities throughout the world.

References

Year of birth missing (living people)
Living people
American forensic scientists
Digital forensics people
Marshall University faculty